Events in the year 2023 in Guinea-Bissau.

Incumbents
 President: Umaro Sissoco Embaló 
 Prime Minister: Nuno Gomes Nabiam

Events
Ongoing — COVID-19 pandemic in Guinea-Bissau
 4 June - 2023 Guinea-Bissau legislative election

References

 
2020s in Guinea-Bissau
Years of the 21st century in Guinea-Bissau
Guinea-Bissau
Guinea-Bissau